Saban Romanovic is a Serbian former footballer who played as a forward.

Career 
Romanovic went overseas in 1972 to play in the National Soccer League with the Serbian White Eagles along with teammate Mike Bakić. In his debut season with the White Eagles he finished as the league's top goal scorer with 23 goals. The following season he played in the Mexican Primera División with C.D. Veracruz. After a season in Mexico he returned to play with the Serbian White Eagles for the 1974 season.

In 1975, he signed with league rivals Toronto Italia, and assisted in securing the NSL Championship. He also featured in the Canadian Open Cup where he contributed a goal in securing the title against London Boxing Club of Victoria. In 1977, he played with Toronto Panhellenic, and finished as the league's top goal scorer for the second time in his career.

References  

Year of birth missing (living people)
Living people
Serbian footballers
Yugoslav footballers
Yugoslav expatriate footballers
Association football forwards
Serbian White Eagles FC players
C.D. Veracruz footballers
Toronto Italia players
Canadian National Soccer League players
Liga MX players
Expatriate footballers in Mexico
Yugoslav expatriate sportspeople in Mexico
Expatriate soccer players in Canada
Yugoslav expatriate sportspeople in Canada